10 Items or Less or Ten Items or Less may refer to:

10 Items or Less (TV series), an improvisational comedy series
10 Items or Less (film), a 2006 film by Brad Silberling
An express checkout lane normally found at the supermarket